The Africanized bee, also known as the Africanized honey bee and known colloquially as the "killer bee", is a hybrid of the western honey bee (Apis mellifera), produced originally by crossbreeding of the East African lowland honey bee (A. m. scutellata) with various European honey bee subspecies such as the Italian honey bee (A. m. ligustica) and the Iberian honey bee (A. m. iberiensis).

The East African lowland honey bee was first introduced to Brazil in 1956 in an effort to increase honey production, but 26 swarms escaped quarantine in 1957. Since then, the hybrid has spread throughout South America and arrived in North America in 1985. Hives were found in south Texas in the United States in 1990.

Africanized honey bees are typically much more defensive, react to disturbances faster, and chase people further (400 m) than other varieties of honey bees. They have killed some 1,000 humans, with victims receiving 10 times more stings than from European honey bees. They have also killed horses and other animals.

History 
There are 29 recognized subspecies of Apis mellifera based largely on geographic variations. All subspecies are cross-fertile. Geographic isolation led to numerous local adaptations. These adaptations include brood cycles synchronized with the bloom period of local flora, forming a winter cluster in colder climates, migratory swarming in Africa, enhanced (long-distance) foraging behavior in desert areas, and numerous other inherited traits.

The Africanized honey bees in the Western Hemisphere are descended from hives operated by biologist Warwick E. Kerr, who had interbred honey bees from Europe and southern Africa. Kerr was attempting to breed a strain of bees that would produce more honey in tropical conditions than the European strain of honey bee then in use throughout North, Central and South America. The hives containing this particular African subspecies were housed at an apiary near Rio Claro, São Paulo, in the southeast of Brazil, and were noted to be especially defensive. These hives had been fitted with special excluder screens (called queen excluders) to prevent the larger queen bees and drones from getting out and mating with the local population of European bees. According to Kerr, in October 1957 a visiting beekeeper, noticing that the queen excluders were interfering with the worker bees' movement, removed them, resulting in the accidental release of 26 Tanganyikan swarms of A. m. scutellata. Following this accidental release, the Africanized honey bee swarms spread out and crossbred with local European honey bee colonies.

The descendants of these colonies have since spread throughout the Americas, moving through the Amazon basin in the 1970s, crossing into Central America in 1982, and reaching Mexico in 1985. Because their movement through these regions was rapid and largely unassisted by humans, Africanized honey bees have earned the reputation of being a notorious invasive species. The prospect of killer bees arriving in the United States caused a media sensation in the late 1970s, inspired several horror movies, and sparked debate about the wisdom of humans altering entire ecosystems.

The first Africanized honey bees in the U.S. were discovered in 1985 at an oil field in the San Joaquin Valley of California. Bee experts theorized the colony had not traveled overland but instead "arrived hidden in a load of oil-drilling pipe shipped from South America." The first permanent colonies arrived in Texas from Mexico in 1990. In the Tucson region of Arizona, a study of trapped swarms in 1994 found that only 15 percent had been Africanized; this number had grown to 90 percent by 1997.

Characteristics 
Though Africanized honey bees display certain behavioral traits that make them less than desirable for commercial beekeeping, excessive defensiveness and swarming foremost, they have now become the dominant type of honey bee for beekeeping in Central and South America due to their genetic dominance as well as ability to out-compete their European counterpart, with some beekeepers asserting that they are superior honey producers and pollinators.

Africanized honey bees, as opposed to other Western bee types:
 Tend to swarm more frequently and go farther than other types of honey bees.
 Are more likely to migrate as part of a seasonal response to lowered food supply.
 Are more likely to "abscond"—the entire colony leaves the hive and relocates—in response to stress.
 Have greater defensiveness when in a resting swarm, compared to other honey bee types.
 Live more often in ground cavities than the European types.
 Guard the hive aggressively, with a larger alarm zone around the hive.
 Have a higher proportion of "guard" bees within the hive.
 Deploy in greater numbers for defense and pursue perceived threats over much longer distances from the hive.
 Cannot survive extended periods of forage deprivation, preventing introduction into areas with harsh winters or extremely dry late summers.
 Live in dramatically higher population densities.

North American distribution 

Africanized honey bees are considered an invasive species in the Americas. As of 2002, the Africanized honey bees had spread from Brazil south to northern Argentina and north to Central America, Trinidad (the West Indies), Mexico, Texas, Arizona, Nevada, New Mexico, Florida, and southern California. In June 2005, it was discovered that the bees had spread into southwest Arkansas. Their expansion stopped for a time at eastern Texas, possibly due to the large population of European honey bee hives in the area. However, discoveries of the Africanized honey bees in southern Louisiana show that they have gotten past this barrier, or have come as a swarm aboard a ship.

On 11 September 2007, Commissioner Bob Odom of the Louisiana Department of Agriculture and Forestry said that Africanized honey bees had established themselves in the New Orleans area. In February 2009, Africanized honey bees were found in southern Utah. The bees had spread into eight counties in Utah, as far north as Grand and Emery Counties by May 2017.

In October 2010, a 73-year-old man was killed by a swarm of Africanized honey bees while clearing brush on his south Georgia property, as determined by Georgia's Department of Agriculture. In 2012, Tennessee state officials reported that a colony was found for the first time in a beekeeper's colony in Monroe County in the eastern part of the state. In June 2013, 62-year-old Larry Goodwin of Moody, Texas, was killed by a swarm of Africanized honey bees.

In May 2014, Colorado State University confirmed that bees from a swarm which had aggressively attacked an orchardist near Palisade, in west-central Colorado, were from an Africanized honey bee hive. The hive was subsequently destroyed.

In tropical climates they effectively out-compete European honey bees and, at their peak rate of expansion, they spread north at almost two kilometers (about one mile) a day. There were discussions about slowing the spread by placing large numbers of docile European-strain hives in strategic locations, particularly at the Isthmus of Panama, but various national and international agricultural departments could not prevent the bees' expansion. Current knowledge of the genetics of these bees suggests that such a strategy, had it been tried, would not have been successful.

As the Africanized honey bee migrates further north, colonies continue to interbreed with European honey bees. In a study conducted in Arizona in 2004 it was observed that swarms of Africanized honey bees could take over weakened European honey bee hives by invading the hive, then killing the European queen and establishing their own queen. There are now relatively stable geographic zones in which either Africanized honey bees dominate, a mix of Africanized and European honey bees is present, or only non-Africanized honey bees are found, as in the southern portions of South America or northern North America.

African honey bees abscond (abandon the hive and any food store to start over in a new location) more readily than European honeybees. This is not necessarily a severe loss in tropical climates where plants bloom all year, but in more temperate climates it can leave the colony with not enough stores to survive the winter. Thus Africanized honey bees are expected to be a hazard mostly in the southern states of the United States, reaching as far north as the Chesapeake Bay in the east. The cold-weather limits of the Africanized honey bee have driven some professional bee breeders from Southern California into the harsher wintering locales of the northern Sierra Nevada and southern Cascade Range. This is a more difficult area to prepare bees for early pollination placement in, such as is required for the production of almonds. The reduced available winter forage in northern California means that bees must be fed for early spring buildup.

The arrival of the Africanized honey bee in Central America is threatening the ancient art of keeping Melipona stingless bees in log gums, although they do not interbreed or directly compete with each other. This value exceeds the much smaller  of the various Melipona stingless bee species. Thus economic pressures are forcing beekeepers to switch from the traditional stingless bees of their ancestors to the new reality of the Africanized honey bee. Whether this will lead to their extinction is unknown, but they are well adapted to exist in the wild, and there are a number of indigenous plants that the Africanized honey bees do not visit, so their fate remains to be seen.

Foraging behavior 
Africanized honey bees have a set of characteristics with respect to foraging behavior. Africanized honey bees begin foraging at young ages and harvest a greater quantity of pollen with respect to their European counterparts (Apis mellifera ligustica). This may be linked to the high reproductive rate of the Africanized honey bee which requires pollen to feed the greater number of larvae. Africanized honey bees are also sensitive to sucrose at lower concentrations. This adaptation causes foragers to harvest resources with low concentrations of sucrose that include water, pollen, and unconcentrated nectar. A study comparing A. m. scutellata and A. m. ligustica published by Fewell and Bertram in 2002 suggests that the differential evolution of this suite of behaviors is due to the different environmental pressures experienced by African and European subspecies.

Proboscis extension responses 
Honey bee sensitivity to different concentrations of sucrose is determined by a reflex known as the proboscis extension response or PER. Different species of honey bees that employ different foraging behaviors will vary in the concentration of sucrose that elicits their proboscis extension response.

For example, European honey bees (Apis mellifera ligustica) forage at older ages and harvest less pollen and more concentrated nectar. The differences in resources emphasized during harvesting are a result of the European honey bee's sensitivity to sucrose at higher concentrations.

Evolution 
The differences in a variety of behaviors between different species of honey bees are the result of a directional selection that acts upon several foraging behavior traits as a common entity. Selection in natural populations of honey bees show that positive selection of sensitivity to low concentrations of sucrose are linked to foraging at younger ages and collecting resources low in sucrose. Positive selection of sensitivity to high concentrations of sucrose were linked to foraging at older ages and collecting resources higher in sucrose. Additionally of interest, “change in one component of a suite of behaviors appear[s] to direct change in the entire suite.”

When resource density is low in Africanized honey bee habitats, it is necessary for the bees to harvest a greater variety of resources because they cannot afford to be selective. Honey bees that are genetically inclined towards resources high in sucrose, such as concentrated nectar, will not be able to sustain themselves in harsher environments. The noted PER to low sucrose concentration in Africanized honey bees may be a result of selective pressure in times of scarcity when their survival depends on their attraction to low quality resources.

Morphology and genetics 
The popular term "killer bee" has only limited scientific meaning today because there is no generally accepted fraction of genetic contribution used to establish a cut-off between a "killer" honey bee and an ordinary honey bee.

Morphological tests
Although the native East African lowland honey bees (Apis mellifera scutellata) are smaller and build smaller comb cells than the European honey bees, their hybrids are not smaller. Africanized honey bees have slightly shorter wings, which can only be recognized reliably by performing a statistical analysis on micro-measurements of a substantial sample.

One of the problems with this test is that there are other subspecies, such as Apis mellifera iberiensis, which also have shortened wings. This trait is hypothesized to derive from ancient hybrid haplotypes thought to have links to evolutionary lineages from Africa. Some belong to Apis mellifera intermissa, but others have an indeterminate origin; the Egyptian honeybee (Apis mellifera lamarckii), present in small numbers in the southeastern U.S., has the same morphology.

DNA tests
Currently testing techniques have moved away from external measurements to DNA analysis, but this means the test can only be done by a sophisticated laboratory. Molecular diagnostics using the mitochondrial DNA (mtDNA) cytochrome b gene can differentiate A. m. scutellata from other A. mellifera lineages, though mtDNA only allows one to detect Africanized colonies that have Africanized queens and not colonies where a European queen has mated with Africanized drones. A test based on single nucleotide polymorphisms was created in 2015 to detect Africanized bees based on the proportion of African and European ancestry.

Western variants
The western honey bee is native to the continents of Europe, Asia, and Africa. As of the early 1600s, it was introduced to North America, with subsequent introductions of other European subspecies 200 years later. Since then, they have spread throughout the Americas. The 29 subspecies can be assigned to one of four major branches based on work by Ruttner and subsequently confirmed by analysis of mitochondrial DNA. African subspecies are assigned to branch A, northwestern European subspecies to branch M, southwestern European subspecies to branch C, and Mideast subspecies to branch O. The subspecies are grouped and listed. There are still regions with localized variations that may become identified subspecies in the near future, such as A. m. pomonella from the Tian Shan Mountains, which would be included in the Mideast subspecies branch.

The western honey bee is the third insect whose genome has been mapped, and is unusual in having very few transposons. According to the scientists who analyzed its genetic code, the western honey bee originated in Africa and spread to Eurasia in two ancient migrations. They have also discovered that the number of genes in the honey bee related to smell outnumber those for taste. The genome sequence revealed several groups of genes, particularly the genes related to circadian rhythms, were closer to vertebrates than other insects. Genes related to enzymes that control other genes were also vertebrate-like.

African variants
There are two lineages of the East African lowland subspecies (Apis mellifera scutellata) in the Americas: actual matrilineal descendants of the original escaped queens and a much smaller number that are Africanized through hybridization. The matrilineal descendants carry African mtDNA, but partially European nuclear DNA, while the honey bees that are Africanized through hybridization carry European mtDNA, and partially African nuclear DNA. The matrilineal descendants are in the vast majority. This is supported by DNA analyses performed on the bees as they spread northwards; those that were at the "vanguard" were over 90% African mtDNA, indicating an unbroken matriline, but after several years in residence in an area interbreeding with the local European strains, as in Brazil, the overall representation of African mtDNA drops to some degree. However, these latter hybrid lines (with European mtDNA) do not appear to propagate themselves well or persist. Population genetics analysis of Africanized honey bees in the United States, using a maternally inherited genetic marker, found 12 distinct mitotypes, and the amount of genetic variation observed supports the idea that there have been multiple introductions of AHB into the United States.

A newer publication shows the genetic admixture of the Africanized honey bees in Brazil. The small number of honey bees with African ancestry that were introduced to Brazil in 1956, which dispersed and hybridized with existing managed populations of European origin and quickly spread across much of the Americas, is an example of a massive biological invasion as earlier told in this article. Here, they analysed whole‐genome sequences of 32 Africanized honey bees sampled from throughout Brazil to study the effect of this process on genome diversity. By comparison with ancestral populations from Europe and Africa, they infer that these samples had 84% African ancestry, with the remainder from western European populations. However, this proportion varied across the genome and they identified signals of positive selection in regions with high European ancestry proportions. These observations are largely driven by one large gene‐rich 1.4 Mbp segment on chromosome 11 where European haplotypes are present at a significantly elevated frequency and likely confer an adaptive advantage in the Africanized honey bee population.

Consequences of selection 
The chief difference between the European subspecies of honey bees kept by beekeepers and the African ones is attributable to both selective breeding and natural selection. By selecting only the most gentle, non-defensive subspecies, beekeepers have, over centuries, eliminated the more defensive ones and created a number of subspecies suitable for apiculture.

In Central and southern Africa there was formerly no tradition of beekeeping, and the hive was destroyed in order to harvest the honey, pollen and larvae. The bees adapted to the climate of Sub-Saharan Africa, including prolonged droughts. Having to defend themselves against aggressive insects such as ants and wasps, as well as voracious animals like the honey badger, African honey bees evolved as a subspecies group of highly defensive bees unsuitable by a number of metrics for domestic use.

As Africanized honey bees migrate into regions, hives with an old or absent queen can become hybridized by crossbreeding. The aggressive Africanized drones out-compete European drones for a newly developed queen of such a hive, ultimately resulting in hybridization of the existing colony. Requeening, a term for replacing out the older existing queen with a new, already fertilized one, can avoid hybridization in apiaries. As a prophylactic measure, the majority of beekeepers in North America tend to requeen their hives annually, maintaining strong colonies and avoiding hybridization.

Defensiveness 
Africanized honey bees exhibit far greater defensiveness than European honey bees and are more likely to deal with a perceived threat by attacking in large swarms. These hybrids have been known to pursue a perceived threat for a distance of well over 500 meters (1,640 ft).

The venom of an Africanized honey bee is the same as that of a European honey bee, but since the former tends to sting in far greater numbers, deaths from them are naturally more numerous than from European honey bees. While allergies to the European honey bee may cause death, complications from Africanized honey bee stings are usually not caused from allergies to their venom. Humans stung many times by the Africanized honey bees can exhibit serious side effects such as inflammation of the skin, dizziness, headaches, weakness, edema, nausea, diarrhea, and vomiting. Some cases even progress to affecting different body systems by causing increased heart rates, respiratory distress, and even renal failure. Africanized honey bee sting cases can become very serious, but they remain relatively rare and are often limited to accidental discovery in highly populated areas.

Impact on humans

Fear factor 
The Africanized honey bee is widely feared by the public, a reaction that has been amplified by sensationalist movies (such as The Swarm) and some of the media reports. Stings from Africanized honey bees kill on average one or two people per year.

As the Africanized honey bee spreads through Florida, a densely populated state, officials worry that public fear may force misguided efforts to combat them:

Misconceptions 
"Killer bee" is a term frequently used in media such as movies that portray aggressive behavior or actively seeking to attack humans. "Africanized honey bee" is considered a more descriptive term in part because their behavior is increased defensiveness compared to European honey bees that can exhibit similar defensive behaviors when disturbed.

The sting of the Africanized honey bee is no more potent than any other variety of honey bee, and although they are similar in appearance to European honey bees, they tend to be slightly smaller and darker in color. Although Africanized honey bees do not actively search for humans to attack, they are more dangerous because they are more easily provoked, quicker to attack in greater numbers, and then pursue the perceived threat farther, for as much as a quarter of a mile (400 m).

While studies have shown that Africanized honey bees can infiltrate European honey bee colonies and then kill and replace their queen (thus usurping the hive), this is less common than other methods. Wild and managed colonies will sometimes be seen to fight over honey stores during the dearth (periods when plants are not flowering), but this behavior should not be confused with the aforementioned activity. The most common way that a European honey bee hive will become Africanized is through crossbreeding during a new queen's mating flight. Studies have consistently shown that Africanized drones are more numerous, stronger and faster than their European cousins and are therefore able to out-compete them during these mating flights. The result of mating between Africanized drones and European queens is almost always Africanized offspring.

Impact on apiculture 
In areas of suitable temperate climate, the survival traits of Africanized honey bee colonies help them outperform European honey bee colonies. They also return later and work under conditions that often keep European honey bees hive-bound. This is the reason why they have gained a well-deserved reputation as superior honey producers, and those beekeepers who have learned to adapt their management techniques now seem to prefer them to their European counterparts. Studies show that in areas of Florida that contain Africanized honey bees, the honey production is higher than in areas in which they do not live. It is also becoming apparent that Africanized honey bees have another advantage over European honey bees in that they seem to show a higher resistance to several health issues, including parasites such as Varroa destructor, some fungal diseases like chalkbrood, and even the mysterious colony collapse disorder which is currently plaguing beekeepers. Despite all its negative factors, it is possible that the Africanized honey bee might actually end up being a boon to apiculture.

Queen management 
In areas where Africanized honey bees are well established, bought and pre-fertilized (i.e. mated) European queens can be used to maintain a hive's European genetics and behavior. However, this practice can be expensive, since these queens must be bought and shipped from breeder apiaries in areas completely free of Africanized honey bees, such as the northern U.S. states or Hawaii. As such, this is generally not practical for most commercial beekeepers outside the U.S., and it is one of the main reasons why Central and South American beekeepers have had to learn to manage and work with the existing Africanized honey bee. Any effort to crossbreed virgin European queens with Africanized drones will result in the offspring exhibiting Africanized traits; only 26 swarms escaped in 1957, and nearly 60 years later there does not appear to be a noticeable lessening of the typical Africanized characteristics.

Gentleness 
Not all Africanized honey bee hives display the typical hyper-defensive behavior, which may provide bee breeders a point to begin breeding a gentler stock (gAHBs). Work has been done in Brazil towards this end, but in order to maintain these traits, it is necessary to develop a queen breeding and mating facility in order to requeen colonies and to prevent reintroduction of unwanted genes or characteristics through unintended crossbreeding with feral colonies. In Puerto Rico, some bee colonies are already beginning to show more gentle behavior. This is believed to be because the more gentle bees contain genetic material that is more similar to the European honey bee, although they also contain Africanized honey bee material. This degree of aggressiveness is surprisingly almost unrelated to individual genetics – instead being almost entirely determined by the entire hive's proportion of aggression genetics.

Safety 
While bee incidents are much less common than they were during the first wave of Africanized honey bee colonization, this can be largely attributed to modified and improved bee management techniques. Prominent among these are locating bee-yards much farther away from human habitation, creating barriers to keep livestock at enough of a distance to prevent interaction, and education of the general public to teach them how to properly react when feral colonies are encountered and what resources to contact. The Africanized honey bee is considered the honey bee of choice for beekeeping in Brazil.

Impact on pets  and livestock  

Africanized honey bees are a threat to outdoor pets, especially mammals. The most detailed information available pertains to dogs.

Less is known about livestock as victims. There is a widespread consensus that cattle suffer occasional Africanized honey bee attacks in Brazil, but there is little documentation about this. It appears that cows sustain hundreds of stings if they are attacked, but can survive with injury.

See also 
 Bee removal

Notes

References

Further reading

External links 

  includes information on biology, habits, habitat and prevention tips
 
  Lists general information and resources for Africanized Honeybee.
 
 
 

Western honey bee breeds
Hybrid animals
Agricultural pest insects
Invasive insect species
Pest insects
Beekeeping in the United States
Invasive animal species in the United States